Joseph Richard "Speed" Walker (January 23, 1898 – June 20, 1959) was a Major League Baseball player. Walker played for St. Louis Cardinals in the 1923 season. He played just two games in his career, having two hits in seven at-bats, with one run scored, playing first base.

Walker was born in Munhall, Pennsylvania, and died in West Mifflin, Pennsylvania.

External links

1898 births
1959 deaths
People from Munhall, Pennsylvania
Major League Baseball first basemen
St. Louis Cardinals players
Baseball players from Pennsylvania